The Society of Operations Engineers (SOE) is an engineering professional organization in the United Kingdom, formed by the merger of following three bodies in 2000: Institute of Road Transport Engineers (IRTE), Institution of Plant Engineers (IPlantE), and Bureau of Engineer Surveyors (BES). In 2019, members of the Society of Environmental Engineers were invited to join SOE as SEE ceased operations.

Professional accreditation
The SOE is an Institution Member of Engineering Council, its members with at Member (MSOE) and Fellow (FSOE) may be nominated for registration at Engineering Technician (EngTech), Incorporated Engineer (IEng) and Chartered Engineer (CEng) levels.

References

External links 
 

Engineering societies based in the United Kingdom
Manufacturing in the United Kingdom
Organisations based in the City of Westminster
2000 establishments in the United Kingdom
Scientific organizations established in 2000